Legionowo Arena is an indoor multi-sports arena in Legionowo, Mazovia.

Since 2018 DPD have been the titular sponsors of the arena.

References

External links
 - Official website 

Indoor arenas in Poland
Handball venues in Poland
Volleyball venues in Poland
Boxing venues in Poland
Mixed martial arts venues in Poland
Music venues in Poland
Sports venues completed in 2010
2010 establishments in Poland
Legionowo County